Rendezvous, aka RDV, is the annual four-day cultural festival organised by the Indian Institute of Technology Delhi in October.

Events
Rendezvous, in its every edition, hosts a large number of competitional and non-competitional events engaging a nationwide participation. Ms. and Mr. RDV, Fashion Show, Rap Battle, Beat Boxing are a few to name the mega flagship events. Apart from these, a variety of competitions, workshops and talk sessions are organised by the respective cultural clubs of IIT Delhi namely Dance Club, Debating Club, Design Club, Dramatics Club, Fine Arts and Crafts Club, Hindi Samiti, Literary Club, Music Club, Photography and Films Club, Spic Macay, Quizzing Club.

Pronites

Following each eventful day at Rendezvous, Pronite brings out artists from various cultures together on a stage. It has been the main star attraction of the festival with performing artists ranging from the famous Indian musical trio, Shankar-Ehsaan-Loy to the famous American Rock Band, Hoobastank, having performed here. Dhoom, in the past has staged popular performances like Javed Akhtar, Shankar Mahadevan, Ehsaan Noorani and Loy Medonsa, Javed Ali in 2015, Falak Shabir and Arjit Singh in 2014, Farhan Akhtar, Hoobastank in 2013, Coke Studio@MTV (Papon, Shilpa Rao and Advaita Band) in 2012; Rabbi Shergill, Rohit Deshmukh, Kailash Kher, Amaan and Ayaan Ali Khan, Mohit Chauhan, KK in 2010. The Pro-Show Spectrum has maintained the legacy of hosting star casts of popular Bollywood movies like Chakravyuh (Arjun Rampal, Abhay Deol, Manoj Bajpai, Esha Gupta) in 2012, Band Baaja Baaraat (Anushka Sharma, Ranveer Singh) and Break Ke Baad (Deepika Padukone, Imran Khan) in 2010. Blitzkrieg has staged several international headliner bands like Cypher16 in 2012, Textures in 2010, Malefice in 2009, and Mindsnare in 2008; and Indian Rock Bands like Parikrama.

Apart from competitions, some of the Indian top bands are also invited to perform. 2016 witnessed the presence of the Junkyard Groove and Spud in the Box. These have been judged by prominent judges like Shiamak Davar (Choreography Competition 2012) and Shahnaz Husain (Fashion Show 2015).

Programs

Influencer Program
Influencer Program aims to empower Social Media influencers with any number of followers and give them a platform to showcase their skills and gain fame. Benefits ranging from cash prizes and goodies to callouts at the Pronites await the winners.

Campus Ambassador Program
Campus Ambassador Program seeks students from different colleges to promote Rendezvous in their college community. The Ambassador is the sole point of contact for RDV in their college.

Informals 
Informal stages are set up on the streets of IIT Delhi to attract and engage with the passers-by. They host informal events throughout the four days of the festival. In the past, they have seen the presence of Bollywood personalities including Anushka Sharma, John Abraham, Deepika Padukone and Piyush Mishra.

The commencement of the "RDV’s Got talent" has given students a platform to showcase their skills.

References

External links

Official Website
Rendezvous, IIT Delhi - Facebook Page
Rendezvous, IIT Delhi - Instagram Page
Rendezvous, IIT Delhi - LinkedIn Page
IIT Delhi

Indian Institutes of Technology festivals
IIT Delhi
College festivals in India 
Culfests
Cultural festivals in India
Festivals established in 1976
1976 establishments in Delhi